Golßen or Golssen is a town in the district of Dahme-Spreewald, in Brandenburg, Germany. It is the administrative seat of the Amt ("collective municipality") Unterspreewald.

Geography
It is situated in the northwest of the Lower Lusatia region, close to the border with the Brandenburgian Mittelmark core territory. The municipal area stretches from the eastern (Lower) Fläming Heath down to the Glogau-Baruth Urstromtal (glacial valley) traversed by the Dahme River. It also comprises the villages of Mahlsdorf and Zützen.

Golßen station is a stop on the Berlin–Dresden railway line. The area around the town is known for the cultivation of Spreewald gherkins.

History

The settlement arose in the course of the German Ostsiedlung eastward migration during the 11th century, possibly at the site of an earlier Slavic village of fortress. Golsyn in the March of Lusatia was first mentioned in a 1276 deed issued by the Wettin margraves. With the former march, Golßen was purchased by the Luxembourg emperor Charles IV in 1367 and incorporated into the Lands of the Bohemian Crown. The Bohemian kings temporarily put the estates around Golßen Castle in pawn to several holders, such as Margrave William I of Meissen (in 1395).

During the Thirty Years' War, the Lusatias again passed to the Wettin electors of Saxony by the 1635 Peace of Prague. Golßen Castle was built about 1723, it passed to the Counts of Solms-Baruth in the 19th century. Surrounded by extended gardens, parts of the buildings were refurbished in a Neoclassical style by Eduard Knoblauch in 1852. The neighbouring estates of Zützen were held by the Kleist noble family. A Baroque palace in Zützen, erected according to plans designed by Georg Wenzeslaus von Knobelsdorff, burnt down completely in the late days of World War II.

After the Napoleonic Wars, Golßen was incorporated into the Prussian province of Brandenburg in 1816.

Demography

Politics
Seats in the municipal assembly (Stadtverordnetenversammlung) as of 2019 local elections: 
 Independent Citizen's List Golßen : 5 (+5)
 Social Democratic Party of Germany (SPD): 5 (-4)
 Alternative for Germany (AFD): 4 (+4)
 Christian Democratic Union (CDU): 2 (-2)

The mayor in Golßen is Daniela Maurer (SPD).

Sons and daughters of the town

 Johann Eberhard von Droste zu Zützen (1662-1726), Saxon general, commander of the fortress Königstein and landlord
 Knut Hickethier (born 1945), media scientist
 Alfred Hoffmann (born 1958), Catholic clergyman

References

Localities in Dahme-Spreewald